Mikhail Kukushkin was the current champion, but chose not to compete this year.

Adrian Mannarino won the title when Tatsuma Ito retired in the final.

Seeds

Draw

Finals

Top half

Bottom half

References
 Main Draw
 Qualifying Draw

External links
Main Draw, in ATP (or PDF)

American Express - TED Open - Singles
2014 Singles
2014 in Turkish tennis